Melvin Leo Rambin (October 7, 1941 – June 19, 2001) was a banker in Monroe, the seat of Ouachita Parish in northeastern Louisiana, who was thus far the only Republican in his city to have held the office of mayor since the 19th century era of Reconstruction. Rambin was elected in March 2000 but died in office of liver cancer after having served for only eleven-and-a-half months.

Background
Rambin was the son of the former Marjorie Pennington (1914-2001), a Baptist and a schoolteacher, and William Robert Rambin, Sr. (1912-1986), a Roman Catholic. The senior Rambins were natives and at time residents of Goldonna in Natchitoches Parish, where they are interred at Goldonna Cemetery. In her later years Mrs. Rambin was living in Monroe, where she died five months after son Melvin's passing, but she had been residing in Goldonna at the time of her husband's death in 1986. Rambin has a surviving older brother, William R. Rambin, Jr. (born. c. 1939), of Monroe. 
 
It is unclear when the Rambins moved from Natchitoches Parish to Monroe, but Rambin graduated in 1959 from Neville High School in Monroe. In 1963, he received his bachelor's degree from the University of Louisiana at Monroe, when the institution was known as Northeast Louisiana State College. In 1965, he obtained his Master of Business Administration from Louisiana State University in Baton Rouge. Over the course of his career, Rambin was an officer of several financial institutions, including the Louisiana National Bank in Baton Rouge, Premier Bank, and Bank One in Northeast Louisiana.

Brief political career
In 1999, Rambin was appointed by Republican Governor Murphy J. Foster, Jr., as a regent of the Louisiana Board of Regents of Higher Education.
 
Rambin in 2000 unseated Abe E. Pierce, III, a Democrat and the first of thus far two African-American mayors of Monroe since Reconstruction. According to Pierce, his supporters were complacent and assumed that he would be reelected to a second term in 2000 and did not therefore vote in large numbers at all. Rambin's supporters, mostly whites and the numerical minority of the Monroe population, conversely organized with discretion at the grass roots. Glen Robinson (born c. 1954), a former car salesman and later the information officer for the Ouachita Parish Sheriff's Department, was the chairman of the highly organized Rambin campaign. The GOP used horns and sirens to stir up interest in their candidate and asked supporters to turn on porch lights after they had cast their ballots so that the campaign could easily target persons in friendly neighborhoods who had not yet voted to encourage them to go to the polls in the final hours.
 
Mayoral election day coincided with the presidential primaries in which Al Gore and George W. Bush won large majorities in Ouachita Parish on the path toward their party nominations. The final tabulation was 9,042 (53.8 percent) to Pierce's 7,219 (43 percent). The remaining 3.2 percent of the vote was divided among three other candidates. Rambin garnered 90 percent of the white vote, more than enough to win because the black turnout was just 45 percent.
 
After Rambin's death, the city council chose District 5 member Jamie Mayo, an African American businessman, to serve as interim mayor. In October 2001, Mayo was elected to fill the remainder of Rambin's term. He has continued to serve in the position, having won full terms in 2004, 2008, 2012, and 2016.

Family and death
Rambin was a lifetime member of the Men's Club of Catholic High School in Baton Rouge. He was married to the former Julia Ann Wilkinson (born c. 1944), an employee of the United Way. The Rambin children are Ashley A. Rambin Gordon, Ryan C. Rambin, and Sharon L. Rambin Beary. 
 
Rambin died in office as mayor of Monroe at the age of fifty-nine. He is interred not in Monroe but at Roselawn Memorial Park in Baton Rouge.

References

 

1941 births
2001 deaths
Place of birth missing
Mayors of Monroe, Louisiana
Louisiana Republicans
People from Goldonna, Louisiana
Politicians from Baton Rouge, Louisiana
Businesspeople from Louisiana
American bankers
School board members in Louisiana
University of Louisiana at Monroe alumni
Louisiana State University alumni
Deaths from cancer in Louisiana
Deaths from liver cancer
20th-century American politicians
Burials in Louisiana
Catholics from Louisiana
20th-century American businesspeople